This narrative is told in Luke 5:1-3, Mark 4:1, and Matthew 13:1–3. Owing to the vast crowds that followed him from the surrounding towns and villages to listen to his doctrine, Jesus retired to the sea coast. There he entered a boat, that he used as a pulpit, and addressed the crowd on the shore.

The narrative occurs as an introduction to a set of Jesus' parable teachings, which starts with the Parable of the Sower.

Numerous artists have made this event the subject of their artwork, including, James Tissot and Alexandre Bida.

Narrative

Commentary

4th-century
Hilary of Poitiers comments on why Jesus sat in the ship, while the crowd remained on the shore, writing, "for He was about to speak in parables, and by this action signifies that they who were without the Church could have no understanding of the Divine Word. The ship offers a type of the Church, within which the word of life is placed, and is preached to those without, and who as being barren sand cannot understand it."

17th-century

Cornelius a Lapide notes that when Jesus, as was his custom, had finished preaching in His house in Capernaum, He sent away the crowd so they might attend to themselves, and that He should allow some rest and food for Himself and His disciples. However, since He knew that the crowds were about to come to Him in such numbers that His house could not accommodate them, He left to the wide, open shore of the Sea of Galilee. There he used a boat as a pulpit and preached to the crowd on the shore.

19th-century (Catholic)
John McEvilly comments on the words “many things,” (Matt 13:3) writing, "most likely, He spoke much more than is here recorded. For, if every thing which Jesus did, was written, “the world itself would not be able to contain the books that should be written”" (John 21:25).

A number of commentators have used this episode to support the primacy of Peter, since Jesus uses Peter's boat to preach from, and Peter would later become the foremost disciple among the apostles for preaching himself (see Acts 2).

Gallery of art

See also 
 Life of Jesus in the New Testament
 Ministry of Jesus
 Calling of the disciples
 Parables of Jesus
 Miraculous catch of fish
 Sea of Galilee Boat

References 

Gospel of Matthew
Sea of Galilee